Pantelis Kandilas (Greek: Παντελής Κανδύλας) was a Greek chieftain of the Macedonian Struggle.

Biography 
Kandilas was born in Vogatsiko of Kastoria in 1860s. He participated in the 1896–1897 Greek Macedonian rebellion and in the Greco-Turkish War (1897). In 1904 he set up an armed group consisting of 5 men. In the same year he met with Pavlos Melas, whom he accompanied to Lechovo in Florina. He was appointed the leader of an armed group, cooperating with Georgios Tsontos, with whom he participated in many operations in Kastanohoria and Voio. He took part in the operation of the village of Libisovo (now Agios Ilias) in the prefecture of Kastoria, where the komitadji Konstanto Zifkov was killed. In 1905 he was arrested by the Ottoman authorities, with other men of the chieftain Alexandros Karalivanos and was sentenced to three years imprisonment.

References 
 Αρχείο Διεύθυνσης Εφέδρων Πολεμιστών Αγωνιστών Θυμάτων Αναπήρων (ΔΕΠΑΘΑ), Αρχείο Μακεδονικού Αγώνα, φ. Κ-606
 Ιωάννης Σ. Κολιόπουλος (επιστημονική επιμέλεια), Αφανείς, γηγενείς Μακεδονομάχοι, Εταιρεία Μακεδονικών Σπουδών, University Studio Press, Thessaloniki, 2008, p. 74

Greek people of the Macedonian Struggle
Prisoners and detainees of the Ottoman Empire
Greek Macedonians
Macedonian revolutionaries (Greek)
People from Kastoria (regional unit)